Agallidwipa pauliana is a species of leafhoppers from Madagascar.

References 

Insects described in 1954
Insects of Madagascar
Megophthalminae